The 1987 San Diego Chargers was the franchise's 18th season in the National Football League (NFL), and the 28th overall. The team improved on their 4–12 record in 1986, finishing 8–7 but missing the playoffs. The strike of 1987 reduced the regular season schedule from sixteen to fifteen games. The Chargers started the season 8–1, with victories over eventual division winners Indianapolis and Cleveland, before collapsing to lose their final six games of the season, narrowly missing the playoffs. All but one of their final six losses came to teams that made the postseason in 1987.

As was the case with all NFL teams in 1987, the Chargers were obliged to field a replacement team for three weeks due to the NFLPA strike. This team, dubbed the 'Re-Chargers' by head coach Al Saunders, was made up primarily of players who had missed the final cut for an NFL squad in preseason. While the regular players picketed outside San Diego's Jack Murphy Stadium, the new Chargers won three games out of three against other replacement teams. After the strike ended, most of the regular Chargers reclaimed their jobs, though some replacements were able to keep their places in the squad beyond the end of the 1987 season.

In the twelve non-strike games, San Diego performed fairly well on defense, with defensive end Lee Williams, linebacker Billy Ray Smith and safety Vencie Glenn among the leaders. The offense, however, struggled increasingly as the season wore on. With the run game contributing little, it fell to quarterback Dan Fouts and the passing attack to produce points, but they were hampered by sacks, turnovers and Fouts' struggle to recapture his mid-career form. It would be his final season in the NFL, having spent his entire fifteen-year career in San Diego. Also retiring after the season was tight end Kellen Winslow, ending his nine-year career with a fifth Pro Bowl berth.

Offseason

Departures and arrivals 
San Diego lost a future Hall of Fame wide receiver during the offseason when Charlie Joiner announced his retirement. Joiner finished as the NFL career leader in receptions (750) and receiving yards (12,146). At 39, he considered himself too old to play on, but switched to a new role as the Chargers' receiving coach. The Chargers also traded their third-leading wide receiver from 1986, Trumaine Johnson, to the Buffalo Bills in exchange for linebacker David Brandon and a 3rd-round draft pick. They also switched backup running backs, trading Buford McGee and two future draft picks to the Rams in exchange for Barry Redden. McGee had scored seven touchdowns in the first nine weeks in 1986, but missed the final seven games after a double knee surgery; Redden was a former 1st-round draft pick, but went on to have only 30 carries during his two years with the Chargers. On the offensive line, the Chargers added Broderick Thompson, a former Cowboy who started only 3 games in 1987, but 76 out of a possible 80 from 1988 to 1992.

An established defensive player also left the active squad when linebacker Woodrow Lowe was placed on injured reserve during preseason; he did not play again, and was eventually released on  11 March 1988. Lowe spent his entire playing career with the Chargers, appearing in 164 out of a possible 165 games from 1976 to 1986. San Diego also added an established linebacker in Chip Banks, who had made the Pro Bowl in four of his five seasons with the Browns, though he had held out while in Cleveland. After playing a single season in San Diego, he did so once more, and never played for the Chargers again after 1987. On the defensive line, San Diego picked up Mike Charles, a nose tackle recently cut by Miami. He went on to start 25 games during three years with the Chargers. Meanwhile, defensive end Earl Wilson, who had started 15 games over the past two seasons, was cut after Week 1. He was arrested as part of a drug investigation later the same day, though the Chargers stated the timing was coincidental and his release was based purely on performance. In the defensive backfield, San Diego traded cornerback Wayne Davis for Buffalo safety Martin Bayless. Bayless started every non-strike game for the Chargers in 1987, and went on to start 66 times in total during five seasons in San Diego.

The Chargers held a battle for the placekicker position through training camp and preseason, eventually won by free agent acquisition Vince Abbott, who secured his first NFL job after losing four previous training camp battles. This meant that veteran Rolf Benirschke lost his job after ten years in San Diego; he was traded to Dallas for a draft pick. Benirschke felt he wasn't given a fair chance to compete for the job after attempting no field goals in preseason. He left as the team's leading scorer (766 points), and the third-best kicker in league history by career field goal percentage (70.2%), though his accuracy had diminished through the past four seasons.

NFL draft 

Despite having three veteran tight ends on their roster, the Chargers added more depth at that position with their 1st-round draft pick; Rod Bernstine had played at running back in high school, but converted to tight end under the advice of Texas A&M coach Jackie Sherrill. He had only 10 catches as a rookie, and eventually switched back to the running back position. Bernstine would finish his time with the Chargers having scored 19 touchdowns and rushed for over 2,000 yards, with a further 888 receiving yards.

Except for Bernstine, the Chargers received little production from their 1987 draft class, with all but four having left the team within two years. 2nd-round pick Lou Brock was placed on injured reserve with an infection of the lymphatic system after only one game, and released before the following season without playing again. Defensive end Karl Wilson started only twice in two years, while quarterback Mark Vlasic started three times in three years. Wide receiver Jamie Holland started in 12 games and also featured as a kickoff returner, but scored only twice in three seasons with the team.

Personnel

Staff

Roster

Preseason 

For the second consecutive season, the Chargers opened their preseason schedule by shutting out the Cowboys. They allowed only 11 first downs and 208 yards, while scoring on a Mark Herrmann touchdown pass to Lionel James and runs by Frank Middleton and Kevin Scott. In the following game, three different quarterbacks (Herrmann, Rick Neuheisel and Vlasic) threw touchdowns to three different receivers (Tim Spencer, Bernstine and Holland). The last of these put San Diego ahead 21–20 with 2:47 to play, but the Rams drove into position for a game-winning field goal with four seconds left.

Starting quarterback Dan Fouts hadn't played at all in the first two games. He did so at San Francisco, completing only 3 of 11 passes for 14 yards while getting sacked three times in a quarter of action, but leading the Chargers to their only points, an Abbott field goal. Fouts played into the 3rd quarter in the final game, leading three touchdown drives. He threw a 64-yard touchdown pass to Wes Chandler and a 1-yarder to Sam Claphan on a tackle-eligible play, before Spencer scored his second touchdown of the preseason on a 4-yard run.

Regular season

Overview 
San Diego lost their opening game and won the next, leaving them at 1–1 heading into the players' strike (see following section). Their replacement players won all three of their games, before the regulars returned and extended the Charger winning streak to eight games in total, including seven wins by six points or fewer. At 8–1, San Diego had the best record in the NFL, and a two-game lead in the AFC West. However, they lost their remaining six games and missed the playoffs, being outscored 162–61 during the losing streak. , the 1987 Chargers remain the only post-merger team to miss the playoffs after starting 8–1. On a 2012 episode of NFL Top 10, theirs was named the #5 worst single season collapse in NFL history.

A weak offense increasingly hampered the Chargers as the season wore on – they scored only seven offensive touchdowns in their final eight games. They finished the season ranked 27th out of 28 teams for points scored, and 21st for yards gained, while converting a league-worst 30% of their third downs. Fouts struggled with injuries, missing two non-strike games, and posted a passer rating of 70.0, below the league average of 75.2 and his worst for 12 years. Chandler led the team with 617 receiving yards, while James, Kellen Winslow and Gary Anderson had over 500 each. Winslow's 53 catches were the second most in the league for a tight end, earning him a fifth Pro Bowl appearance in his ninth and final season, though his yards per catch dropped to a career-low 9.8. While San Diego's passing yardage was the 8th-best in the league, their rushing yardage ranked 27th, and their average yards-per-carry of 3.3 ranked dead last. Curtis Adams led the team, but his 343 yards ranked only 44th in the league.

The defense was middling, finishing 15th in the NFL for both points conceded and yards allowed. This represented an improvements on recent years – San Diego had ranked 23rd or worse in both categories for six consecutive seasons. They were stronger against the pass than the run (4th-ranked vs. 24th-ranked). Defensive end Leslie O'Neal, who had been named AP Defensive Rookie of the Year the previous season, missed all of 1987 with an injury. In his absence, the team's sack total dropped from 62 to 45; Lee Williams repeated as sack leader, though his total dropped from 15 in 16 games to 8 in 12 games. Linebacker Billy Ray Smith led the team with 5 interceptions (he also had 3 sacks), while safety Vencie Glenn was second with 4, one of which he returned 103 yards for a touchdown. On special teams, James ranked 5th in the league with 12.5 yards per punt return, including a touchdown, while Anderson was 17th with 19.7 yards per kickoff return. New kicker Abbott made 13 of his first 17 field goals, but missed his last five attempts and finished 25th in the league with a 59.1% conversion rate. Punter Ralph Mojsiejenko averaged 42.9 yards per kick, earning the lone Pro Bowl nomination of his career.

NFLPA strike

The strike begins 

The 1987 NFL season began under the shadow of a potential National Football League Players Association (NFLPA) strike, with the collective bargaining agreement set to expire and talks stalling as the players pushed for improved free agency rights. The NFLPA set a date of September 22 to strike, two weeks into the season; in response, the owners threatened to field replacement teams stocked with free agents. With this possibility in mind, San Diego was one of several teams who offered optional agreements to players they waived in the build-up to the season, allowing them to rejoin the Chargers in the event of a strike.

With no agreement having been reached, the strike went ahead as planned. Chandler, the Chargers' player representative, described the situation as disappointing, but derided existing free agency restrictions as a "form of slavery". Head coach Al Saunders sympathized with the fans and stated that he could see both sides of the disagreement. He noted that it was his job to coach replacement players if instructed to do so by the league. At a meeting with his players on the eve of the strike, Saunders encouraged them to continue to stay in shape; the players were in agreement, and scheduled group training sessions at the University of California, San Diego. All 45 regular Chargers refused to play for the team once the strike began. This included Fouts, who was not a member of the NFLPA union and stated that he did not consider himself to be on strike. He declined to play on a team stocked with replacement players, noting that he would be risking injury behind an inexperienced offensive line.

Forming the "Re-Chargers" 

The NFL cancelled its slate of Week 3 games, and proceeded to form teams of non-union players to replace the regulars from Week 4 onwards; director of football operations Steve Ortmayer was primarily responsible for building the Chargers' replacement squad. On September 22, they announced the first 18 players in their new team, including eight they had cut in preseason. By the following day's first practice session, the squad had grown to 38, and 5 more appeared for a later session. While many of the new players had little or no NFL experience, cornerback Elvis Patterson had won the Super Bowl with the New York Giants; he had been released one game into the 1987 season after being badly beaten on a touchdown catch by Chicago Bears receiver Willie Gault. Patterson described his signing as a second chance, and expressed optimism that he could keep his place after the strike was over. At quarterback, the Chargers quickly signed Mike Kelley, formerly of the USFL, but since they also hoped to add someone familiar with their offensive scheme they approached Rick Neuheisel and Tom Flick, both of whom they had cut in training camp. Neuheisel struggled with the choice: on September 22, he decided to play, but changed his mind through loyalty to the striking players, and announced on September 23 that he would continue his studies at USC Law School instead. On September 28, Neuheisel met with both Charger officials and striking players to try and get both sides of the story; the following day, he reaffirmed his decision not to play. Finally, he agreed to sign with the Chargers on September 30, noting that some established NFL veterans had crossed the picket lines.

Many of the established players responded with hostility to their replacements. A group of 39 striking Chargers established a picket line at the new players' first practice session. They gathered on a hill overlooking the facility and jeered the performers throughout; Patterson was greeted with cries of "Where's Willie Gault?" Chandler stated that the real players were picketing, and their replacements were "stunt men". Linebacker Gary Plummer said that he couldn't blame the replacements for taking advantage of the situation, but that it was the picketers' job to give them a hard time. Saunders dubbed his new team the "Re-Chargers"; he acknowledged that they were below the regulars in terms of quality, but said, "there's still the thrill of coaching and there's still the challenge." Going into their first replacement game (Week 4), the Chargers had seventeen players with NFL experience on their squad while their opponents, the Cincinnati Bengals, had two.

The replacement games 
With the strike continuing, teams of mostly non-union players contested the NFL's slates of games in Weeks 4 and 5; the replacement Chargers won both games, with none of the regulars involved. As the strike proceeded, increasing numbers of established stars crossing the picket lines; with the defections weakening their position, the NFLPA relented and called off the strike after 24 days, on October 15. This was one day too late for players to report for duty for Week 6, giving the replacements one more game before the majority of them would lose their jobs. The regular Chargers turned up at Jack Murphy Stadium on October 16 ready to work; they were told by Ortmayer that they could use the club's facilities, but would not be paid or permitted to play that week, whereupon they left the building. One exception was defensive lineman Terry Unrein, who had contacted club management shortly before the deadline and indicated that he would cross the picket line. Two other players (Mack Moore and Jeffery Dale) re-joined the team but were listed on injured reserve and unable to play, so Unrein was the lone strike-breaker to appear for the Chargers in Week 6. Despite their opponents (the Los Angeles Raiders) having several regulars available, the Chargers won again to complete a clean sweep of their strike games.

All three wins came on the road, and the Chargers trailed at halftime in each game. Neuheisel and Kelley split time at quarterback, with one replacing the other in each game – they finished with 672 combined yards (367 for Neuheisel, 305 for Kelley). The top receiver was Al Williams, with 12 catches for 247 yards and a touchdown; his yardage total was the 8th-highest in the league during the strike games. No rushers gained 100 yards or more, with Keyvan Jenkins' 88 yards leading the team. San Diego scored 50 points during the three games, 21st in the league; by contrast, they conceded only 39 points, 5th fewest in the league. Notable performers included Patterson, whose 75-yard interception return touchdown beat the Raiders in the final minute, and Blaise Winter, whose 4 sacks were tied for 3rd-most in the league during the strike games.

After the strike 
A day after their non-union replacements beat the Raiders, the regular Chargers returned for their first practice at Jack Murphy Stadium. While Chandler described practising with the replacements as the biggest challenge for the returning Chargers, alternate player representative Gill Byrd praised their performances and stated that he expected no animosity between the two groups. When the Chargers beat the Kansas City Chiefs 42–21 in their first post-strike game, Chandler and Fouts were among several players credited the result to team unity and the regular practice sessions the striking players had run together.

The Chargers quickly trimmed their list of non-union players once the regulars returned. On 20 October, they cut 35 replacement players, retaining 19 on their active roster and three more on injured reserve. A further seven were waived the following week, together with four members of the pre-strike squad, as NFL teams were given increasingly tight squad limits to meet. By 14 November, the pre-strike limit of 45 players had been restored, with nine replacement Chargers remaining. Patterson won a starting role in 1987, and remained with the team through the 1989 season, while Les Miller and Joe Phillips both started games for the Chargers as late as 1990.

List of replacement players 
Click "show" to expand the table below, which displays brief career notes on the 50 replacement Chargers who featured in at least one strike game (Weeks 4, 5 and 6). Players who were on the Chargers' replacement squad but did not feature in any games are not included; neither is Unrein, a union player who crossed the picket lines and played in Week 6. Players are taken to have pre-strike or post-strike experience in a league if they featured in at least one regular season or postseason game.

Schedule 

Note: Intra-division opponents are in bold text.

Game summaries 
All game reports use the Pro Football Researchers' gamebook archive as a source.

Week 1: at Kansas City Chiefs 

San Diego gave up a late kickoff return touchdown after rallying from a 10-point 4th-quarter deficit. The Chargers turned the ball over twice in the opening eight minutes, with James fumbling a punt and Fouts throwing an interception to Deron Cherry, with the Chiefs converting the second turnover into a field goal. In the 2nd quarter, the Chargers reached a 2nd and 6 at the Kansas City 14, but Cherry produced another interception, this time in the end zone. Kansas City then drove 80 yards and extended their lead, with rookie Christian Okoye breaking away on a 43-yard touchdown run. The Chiefs led 10–0 at halftime.

The Chargers opened the 3rd quarter with a 14-play, 72-yard drive, featuring a 27-yard catch by Winslow. They reached a 1st and goal at the 2, but were pushed back by a Dennis McKnight false start, and had to settle for an Abbott field goal. Abbott missed from 44 yards out on the next Charger drive, and Kansas City responded with a successful kick by Nick Lowery. Midway through the final quarter, San Diego got their lone touchdown of the game when Anderson caught a Fouts pass near the right sideline and barely stayed in bounds before completing a 34-yard touchdown catch. Two plays later, Plummer intercepted Todd Blackledge, setting his team up at the opposition 30. The Chargers drove to the 5, but Anderson was ruled out of bounds in the end zone on an attempted 3rd-down catch, and they settled for a game-tying field goal. Paul Palmer, another Chiefs rookie, returned the ensuing kickoff untouched for a 95-yard touchdown with 3:19 to play. The Chargers then went three-and-out. They nearly had one more opportunity, but Danny Walters was unable to come up with a tipped Blackledge pass, which was instead caught by Stephone Paige for the first down that allowed Kansas City to run out the clock.

Smith had 2 of the Chargers' 4 sacks. They allowed only 58 net passing yards, compared to their own total of 258, but lost the turnover count 4–1. James finished with 6 catches for 100 yards.

Week 2: vs. St. Louis Cardinals 

After taking a 28-point halftime lead, the Chargers barely hung on to win thanks to a late drop at the goal line. The Cardinals went three-and-out on the game's opening possession, and James profited from a block by Glenn en route to an 81-yard punt return touchdown. Three plays later, Neil Lomax fumbled the snap, and Smith recovered at the Cardinal 15. Anderson scored four plays later, and it was 14–0 only 5:24 into the game. Later, Fouts led an 11-play, 80-yard touchdown drive, capped by a 26-yard touchdown pass to Chandler. Late in the half, Smith intercepted Lomax, and James scored from the 7 on the next play. St. Louis reached the Charger 5 before running out of time, leaving the Chargers up 28–0 at the break.

Anderson had a 25-yard run and a 17-yard catch on the opening possession of the second half, but he then fumbled a pitch on 1st and goal from the 10, and St. Louis recovered. The Cardinals were forced to punt, but Fouts was soon intercepted in his own territory to begin the comeback. St. Louis scored 24 points on four consecutive possession, with Lomax throwing three touchdowns. San Diego answered with a punt each time, the final one  of which was run back to the Charger 32 with 1:15 to play. Catches by Jay Novacek and Earl Ferrell moved the ball to the 5 yard line, from where Lomax threw three incompletions, bring up 4th and goal with 20 seconds to play. Due to an error by Smith, Ferrell was open to the right, but he dropped Lomax's pass at the goal line and the Chargers held on to win. Despite the victory, the home crowd booed the team off the field.

Lomax was sacked by five different players, but passed for 457 yards, then a record against the Chargers. San Diego only ran 56 plays, against 86 by the Cardinals.

Week 3: vs. Seattle Seahawks (cancelled) 
All Week 3 games were cancelled due to the NFLPA strike.

Week 4: at Cincinnati Bengals 

The replacement Chargers won their first game after being held scoreless for over three quarters. Todd Spencer fumbled on their first offensive play, though he recovered the ball himself. On the next possession, a 23-yard catch by Al Williams positioned them for a 30-yard field goal attempt that Jeff Gaffney missed wide left. San Diego soon moved back into Bengals territory, but Ken Zachary lost a fumble. Marc Logan then had a 51-yard run, leading to a Cincinnati touchdown two plays later. In the 2nd quarter, the Chargers had a 3rd and 12 from their own 18 and Neuheisel was sacked back in the end zone for a safety. Darrel Hopper blocked a Bengals' field goal try on the ensuing drive, and San Diego took over at the Cincinnati 45. Neuheisel then connected with Williams for 18 yards, but was intercepted two plays later, and the Bengals led 9–0 at halftime.

Cincinnati drove to a 4th and 1 at the San Diego 23 late in the 3rd quarter; the Bengals tried to run for the first down, but were stopped for no gain. Kelley was then inserted at quarterback. His first possession was a three-and-out, but his second was an 8-play, 86-yard touchdown drive: Spencer took a pass 45 yards for the biggest play, and Frank Middleton leapt over the line to score from the 1 two plays later. On the extra point attempt, a bad snap by Dwight Wheeler eluded the holder (Neuheisel). Gaffney picked up the loose ball and ran to the left; confronted by several Bengals, he pitched the ball back to Neuheisel, who headed to the right and dove in from a yard out, pulling the deficit back to 9–7 with eleven minutes to play. After the next three drives ended in punts, Williams had a 15-yard catch to help position Gaffney for a 24-yard field goal, with David Diaz-Infante replacing Wheeler as the long snapper. Gaffney converted the kick with under three minutes left. The Bengals opted to punt after gaining 6 yards on three plays, and Middleton ran for two first downs to help San Diego run out the clock.

Neuheisel completed 10 of 19 passes for 84 yards and an interception; Kelley completed 7 of 9 for 110 yards. The Chargers defense allowed −13 passing yards (the Bengals' quarterbacks had 10 passing yards, and lost 23 yards from 3 sacks); this remains a franchise record .

Week 5: at Tampa Bay Buccaneers 

Strong performances by Neuheisel and the defense helped the replacement Chargers to another comeback win. Tampa Bay were forced to punt on the game's opening possession, but Al Williams fumbled the punt and the Buccaneers recovered, leading to a touchdown two plays later. Gaffney missed a 38-yard field goal on the next drive, and the following seven possessions ended in punts. Kelley had started the game at quarterback, but Neuheisel replaced him with 6:22 to play in the 2nd quarter. Four plays later, he completed a pass to Harry Holt, who lost a fumble. Tampa Bay recovered, added a field goal and led 10–0 at the break.

San Diego scored on their first three possessions of the second half. First, Neuheisel converted a 3rd and 10 with an 18-yard scramble, setting up a 27-yard field goal that Gaffney successfully converted. After a Buccaneers three-and-out, San Diego drove 80 yards in 9 plays to tie the score. Williams had catches of 20 and 32 yards, and Martin Sartin scored from the 2. A sack by Phillips forced another Buccaneers three-and-out, and the Chargers drove for the go-ahead touchdown, a 19-yard pass from Neuheisel to Tim Moffett two minutes into the final quarter. After Tampa Bay pulled three points closer with a field goal, San Diego drove to the Buccaneers' 16 before Sartin lost a fumble. Tampa Bay soon reached a 4th and 1 at their own 35, and elected to punt with three minutes to play. Sartin converted a 3rd and 1 on the next drive, and the Chargers ran all but seven seconds off the clock before the Buccaneers got the ball back. Carl Brazley ended the game with an interception.

Kelley completed 5 of 11 passes for 53 yards; Neuheisel was 18 of 22 for 217 yards and a touchdown. His completion percentage of 81.8% was a Charger record at the time (minimum 20 attempts). Williams caught 5 passes for 110 yards. The Buccaneers gained only 7 first downs, and 70 passing yards.

Week 6: at Los Angeles Raiders 

Patterson's late interception return gave the replacement Chargers their third win, ensuring that the regular players would return as division leaders. Patterson gave his team the first scoring chance of the game when he recovered a fumble at the Raider 8; San Diego eventually went for the touchdown on 4th and goal from the 1, but a Sartin sweep lost 8 yards. Miller forced another fumble on the next play, with Walt Harris recovering, again on the Raider 8. This time, Neuheisel followed two incompletions by scrambling for a touchdown. On their next possession, San Diego produced an 11-minute, 22-play drive that took them from their own 6 yard line to a 3rd and goal from the 4, before Neuheisel was sacked and Gaffney saw his 36-yard field goal attempt blocked. The Raiders then drove 73 yards the other way, and tied the score on a touchdown pass from Vince Evans. After a series of punts, the Raiders took over on their own 25 yard line with 33 seconds left. Evans moved the ball to the San Diego 32, from where he threw another touchdown pass a single second before halftime.

Trailing 14–7, the Chargers punted on their first two possessions of the second half, then switched to Kelley at quarterback. His first possession was a three-and-out, but he opened his second with a 67-yard completion to Calvin Muhammad, setting up a short field goal. After Los Angeles responded with a field goal of their own, Kelley connected with Al Williams for 57 yards, with the same pair ending the drive with a touchdown pass on 3rd and goal from the 7. With the score tied at 17–17, the Raiders drove into position for a 37-yard field goal, which Chris Bahr missed wide right with two minutes left. San Diego went three-and-out, and Los Angeles drove to the Charger 33 in the final minute. Patterson then cut in front of an out pattern, intercepted Evans and ran untouched for a 75-yard touchdown return with 18 seconds to play. Los Angeles reached the Charger 45, from where Evans' final pass was incomplete in the end zone as time expired.

Neuheisel completed 12 of 18 passes for 66 yards; Kelley completed 5 of 9 for 142 yards and a touchdown. The replacement Chargers scored 33 of their 50 points in the 4th quarter. The Raiders had 17 of their regular players available, compared to just one (Unrein) for the Chargers.

Week 7: vs. Kansas City Chiefs 

The regular Chargers returned with a relatively comfortable win. They went 75 yards on their first drive, with Fouts completing 4 of 5 passes for 58 yards, including a 10-yard touchdown to Chandler. Later in the opening quarter, they had a 91-yard touchdown drive; this time Fouts completed 5 of 6 for 71 yards, and Anderson scored with a 1-yard run. In the 2nd quarter, Thomas Benson stopped a threatening Chiefs drive with a fumble recovery, and Mojsiejenko pinned Kansas City at their own 8 with a punt. Two plays later, Bayless sacked Bill Kenney, forcing a fumble that Miller, a replacement player who'd retained his place in the team, recovered in the end zone. The next Charger touchdown was set up by James' 18-yard punt return to the Kansas City 38, setting up a short drive that ended with Fouts sneaking in from the 1; the score was 28–0, with the Chiefs only having gained two first downs. Kenney threw a touchdown on the following drive; in response, San Diego reached a 3rd and 13 at midfield, which they converted when Chandler drew a 31-yard defensive pass interference penalty. Fouts found Winslow in the front corner of the end zone on the following play. Kenney responded with another touchdown pass on the next play from scrimmage, and it was 35–14 at halftime.

Another 18-yard punt return by James set the Chargers up in Chiefs territory early in the second half; they reached a 2nd and goal from the 4, but Fouts fumbled while being sacked, and Kansas City recovered at their own 7. The Chiefs then drove 93 yards in only six plays, aided by three Charger penalties, and scored on Okoye's 1-yard run. Kansas City were threatening to draw closer shortly afterwards when Anderson lost a fumble inside his own 40, but Glenn recovered another fumble two plays later at the Charger 20. Late in the 3rd quarter, Mojsiejenko punted but Kansas City were flagged for roughing the kicker, allowing San Diego to retain possession. Anderson ended that drive with another 1-yard touchdown run. That was the final score of the game; the next two Chiefs possessions ended with a fumble (forced by Lee Williams and recovered by Banks) and an interception by Smith.

Fouts completed 24 of 34 passes for 293 yards, with 2 touchdowns and no interceptions. The Chargers gained 30 first downs and possessed the ball for 37 minutes. Both teams gave up over 100 yards in penalties (141 by the Chiefs, 118 by the Chargers). Chandler's touchdown was the 56th and final one of his career (15 for the New Orleans Saints, 41 for the Chargers).

Week 8: vs. Cleveland Browns 

San Diego overturned a 10-point 4th quarter deficit to win in overtime. Their defense got an early turnover when ex-Brown Banks intercepted Bernie Kosar and returned the ball 20 yards to the Cleveland 15 – James went around right end for a touchdown on the next play. Kosar led a touchdown drive in response, but the Chargers came back with a 9-play, 81-yard drive, facing no 3rd downs and scoring via Bernstine's 10-yard catch (his first career touchdown). In the 2nd quarter, Kosar tied the score with his second touchdown pass. James set up a field goal attempt late in the half with a 21-yard punt return, but Abbott was well short from 52 yards out, keeping the score at 14–14.

Banks forced and recovered a fumble early in the second half, setting his offense up at the Cleveland 29, but Fouts gave the ball back with an interception two plays later. The Browns then drove for a field goal, and James lost a fumble on the next play from scrimmage, setting up a short touchdown drive and a 24–14 Cleveland lead. A 66-yard Charger drive then produced no points, as Abbott missed a 32-yard field goal. Phillips sacked Kosar to force a punt, and Fouts passed on every play of the ensuing drive, completing 6 of 7 for 85 yards, including a 22-yard touchdown pass to James with 5:08 to play. Phillips and Unrein split a 3rd-down sack on the following drive, and a short punt started the Chargers off at the Cleveland 46. San Diego drove as far as the Cleveland 2, but Pete Holohan couldn't come down with Fouts' 3rd down pass in the end zone, and Abbott tied the score with a 22-yard field goal, 1:46 from the end of regulation time. Kosar led his team as far as the San Diego 41, but another sack pushed them back, this time split by Glenn and Bayless. Following an incompletion, they were forced to punt, and the game went into an extra period.

Cleveland won the overtime coin toss and elected to receive. After two runs, they faced a 3rd and 2 at their own 36; Kosar's overthrown pass was intercepted by Glenn and returned 20 yards to the Cleveland 25, with a face mask penalty moving the ball five yards further. After two running plays, Abbott drove the winning 33-yard field goal just inside the left upright.

Fouts completed 25 of 42 passes for 315 yards, 2 touchdowns and 1 interception. James rushed 3 times for 21 yards and a touchdown, and caught 4 passes for 90 yards and a further touchdown. This was the last overtime game the Chargers won until 2002.

Week 9: at Indianapolis Colts 

Humiston recovered a key fumble as San Diego fought back from a 13-point halftime deficit to win. Indianapolis opened the game with an 8-minute field goal drive, and had crossed into Charger territory again when Charles sacked Jack Trudeau, forcing a fumble that Byrd recovered. In the 2nd quarter, two Fouts interceptions set up Colts field goal attempts, though Dean Biasucci missed the second of these. On the next Indianapolis drive, Eric Dickerson rushed 8 times for 50 yards, and Albert Bentley found the end zone for a 13–0 lead. Fouts was intercepted again on the final play of the half.

The first drive of the second half ended with Abbott's 42-yard field goal. Indianapolis tried to convert a 4th and 1 from their own 40 on the following drive, but Banks stopped Bentley for no gain. San Diego reached a 3rd and 1 at the Indianapolis 18, whereupon Fouts fumbled; Center Don Macek recovered, allowing Abbott to kick another field goal, from 37 yards. The Chargers completed their third consecutive scoring drive early in the final quarter; Fouts converted a 3rd and 11 with a 23-yard completion to Chandler, then threw a 5-yard touchdown pass to James on 3rd and goal. After an exchange of punts, the Colts drove from their own 36 to a 1st and goal at the Charger 8. On the following play, Dickerson ran the ball inside the 2 before being tackled by several Chargers; Smith knocked the ball loose, and Humiston recovered in his own end zone with four minutes to play. San Diego then drove 59 yards on 11 plays, with Fouts completed all three of his passes for 40 yards. Abbot made the game-winning field goal from 39 yards with 12 seconds to play.

San Diego improved in several areas after halftime. Their time of possession nearly doubled, from 7:48 to 14:23, while their defense gave up 12 first downs in the first half and 6 in the second. Dickerson gained 103 of his 138 yards before halftime.

Week 10: vs. Los Angeles Raiders 

San Diego won their eighth straight game as a Raider rally fell short. Smith intercepted Marc Wilson's first pass of the game and returned it 22 yards to the Raider 22. A defensive holding penalty on 3rd down prolonged the ensuing drive, and Fouts hit a wide open Winslow for a 9-yard touchdown on 3rd and 8. Bahr missed a 41-yard field goal on the next drive. Late in the opening quarter, another Charger drive was prolonged by a 3rd down penalty, this time of 30 yards – a pass interference drawn by Anderson. That led to a 38-yard field goal by Abbott; he then made a 47-yarder, after Jeff Jackson recovered a fumble in Raider territory. When Abbott was successful from 39 yards late in the half, San Diego led 16–0.

The first nine drives of the second half all ended in punts, with neither offense crossing the halfway line. In the final quarter, San Diego were able to advance from their own 3 to the Raider 41, aided by a 29-yard pass interference penalty, again drawn by Anderson. Fouts then overthrew his intended receiver, resulting in an interception and 58 yard return. Wilson threw a touchdown three plays later with eight minutes left. Aided by another Raider 3rd down penalty, the Chargers then ran over four minutes off the clock before punting. Los Angeles also punted, after reaching 4th and 13 at their own 33 with barely two minutes left. After a Charger three-and-out, the Raiders covered 72 yards in only four plays, scoring on James Lofton's 47-yard touchdown over Charles Romes with 16 seconds left. The ensuing onside kick went out of bounds, allowing San Diego to run out the clock.

San Diego picked up only 88 yards in the second half, and were outgained 365–248 overall. They profited from 17 Raider penalties for 186 yards (the Chargers were penalized 7 times for 60 yards). , this is tied for the most penalties given up by a Charger opponent, and top for penalty yards.

Week 11: at Seattle Seahawks 

Seattle dominated San Diego to end their winning streak. Anderson lost a fumble on the opening kickoff return, leading to a Seahawks' field goal. San Diego responded by driving into Seattle territory and attempting a 4th and 2 at the 44. Herrmann, starting at quarterback because Fouts had a calf injury, was unable to handle the snap, and the attempt failed. The Charger defense thwarted the next Seattle drive when Glenn forced a fumble and Smith recovered at his 10, but the Seahawks scored a touchdown on their following possession. A 34-yard catch by James set up the lone Charger score of the game (a 33-yard Abbott field goal), but Seattle came straight back with another touchdown, and led 17–3 at halftime. They continued to pull away in the second half. Fouts was inserted into the game, but was sacked twice and intercepted once before Herrmann came back in to finish.

San Diego were outgained by 496 yards to 156, outrushed by 277 to 17, possessed the ball for 18:25 (including only 5:12 in the second half); Seattle generated 34 first downs to the Chargers' 6. The yardage differential of −340 was the worst in franchise history to that point, eventually being surpassed in 2003. With the win, Seattle pulled within a game of the Chargers atop the AFC West.

Week 12: vs. Denver Broncos 

Glenn's record-tying interception return wasn't enough to beat the Broncos, who drew within half a game of San Diego. On Denver's first drive they drove 74 yards to a 2nd and goal at the Charger 6, before John Elway's pass was intercepted in the end zone by Glenn; he took off along the right sideline, slipped one tackle, benefitted from a block by Benson, and completed a 103-yard touchdown return, the joint-longest in league history at that point. Elway bounced back on his next two drives, a 51-yard completion setting up a touchdown run, and a 46-yard completion accounting for another touchdown. After an exchange of field goals, Fouts completed four passes for 58 yards, and the Chargers reached a 3rd and goal at the Denver 7 with 17 seconds left and no timeouts, trailing 17–10. Winslow caught Fouts' next pass inside the 1, but was ruled not to have broken the plane of the goal line before being pushed back by three Broncos. Time ran out before San Diego could attempt a field goal.

Denver extended their lead on their first two drives of the second half via two further Elway touchdown passes. After the second of these, the Chargers responded; Anderson had catches of 38 and 33 yards, and Adams scored on a 1-yard run with 14 minutes to play. Denver's next drive ended with a missed field goal, but ran seven minutes off the clock. Fouts drove San Diego into opposition territory before his deep pass was intercepted to effectively clinch the game for Denver. He was intercepted again in the final minute.

Fouts completed 23 of 40 passes for 322 yards, with 2 interceptions. The Chargers were again dominated in terms of time of possession, holding the ball for only 18:41. They gave up a season-high 522 yards of offense. While contemporary reports described Glenn's touchdown as a new record for an interception return, there had been a previous 103-yarder, by Pete Barnum in 1926. The record was tied again by Louis Oliver in 1992 and eventually broken by Ed Reed in 2004.

Week 13: at Houston Oilers 

San Diego fell out of first place in their division with a third straight loss. Glenn intercepted Warren Moon's first pass of the game, setting his offense up at the Oiler 30. Three plays later, Fouts was sacked on a blitz and fumbled; Houston ran the ball back 55 yards for a touchdown. Chandler later fumbled near midfield, setting up a Houston field goal, and the Oilers added ten more points on their following two drives. San Diego staged a mini-revival late in the half, with Lee Williams sacking Moon for a safety, and the offense driving to a 3rd and 5 at the Houston 10 with seven seconds to play. Saunders opted not to risk another play, settling for an Abbott field goal and a 20–5 halftime scoreline.

The Chargers drew no closer in the second half. Houston scored another touchdown the first time they had the ball, then James fumbled at the Oiler 5. Holland drew a 33-yard pass interference penalty on the next drive, and Fouts beat the Oiler blitz to find Winslow for a 6-yard touchdown. San Diego forced a punt, but Fouts again fumbled while being sacked, with Houston recovering at the Charger 30. That led to a touchdown run by Moon, and San Diego didn't score again until the final minute, when Herrmann threw a 9-yard touchdown to Anderson.

Patterson and one Oiler were ejected for their roles in a fracas with one second left in the first half. Chandler caught 10 passes for 140 yards. San Diego outgained Houston by 8 yards (332–324), but fumbled four times and lost them all. Winslow's touchdown was the 45th and final one of his career.

Week 14: vs. Pittsburgh Steelers 

Numerous errors cost the Chargers a chance to move back into first place. Fouts fumbled a handoff to Spencer on the game's second play, but Charles forced Pittsburgh quarterback Mark Malone to fumble in turn a play later, with Smith recovering. San Diego advanced to the Steeler 12 before turning the ball over with a further fumble, this time by Adams. However, they scored soon afterwards when Glenn blocked a punt and Brandon recovered in the end zone. After Pittsburgh missed a field goal, Winslow was ruled just short of the end zone on a 30-yard catch. Anderson appeared to have run for a touchdown on the following play, but McKnight's illegal motion penalty negated the score. Three plays later, the Chargers went for it on 4th and goal from the 1, but Spencer fumbled as he reached for the end zone. San Diego's defense was able convert the good field position into two points on the next play, as Chuck Ehin sacked Malone in the end zone for a safety. Pittsburgh shanked the ensuing free kick, but Daniel Hunter failed to gather the ball at the Steeler 43. In the 2nd quarter, James fumbled on a punt return, leaving the Steelers to drive only 39 yards for their first touchdown of the day. After Abbott missed a 42-yard field goal in the final minute of the half, San Diego led only 9–7.

The Chargers appeared to have earned a 1st down on the Steeler 13 on their first possession of the second half, but Chandler's 22-yard catch was wiped out by another illegal motion penalty, this time on Holohan. That drive ended with Abbott's 48-yard field goal falling short and to the left. Pittsburgh then took the lead, driving 69 yards in only five plays, with Malone running the ball in from the 7. After a third consecutive Charger drive ended in a missed Abbott field goal (short again and wide right, from 46 yards), the Steelers added two Gary Anderson field goals to lead 20–9. San Diego quickly moved into Pittsburgh territory, but a deflected Fouts pass was intercepted with seven minutes to play. The Steeles went three-and-out, and San Diego drove 58 yards in 8 plays to get back into the game. Fouts converted a 4th and 10 with a 14-yard pass to Chandler, and connected with James for back-to-back 15-yard gains, the latter for a touchdown. Following another Steeler three-and-out, San Diego began their final possession on their own 20 with 1:50 to play. Chandler began the drive with a 17-yard catch, Spencer converted a 4th and 1 with a 10-yard carry, and a 20-yard Chandler reception moved the ball to the Pittsburgh 24 with 22 seconds left. From there, Fouts threw four consecutive incompletions.

The Chargers outgained Pittsburgh by 435 yards to 254, but committed five of the game's six turnovers, losing four fumbles for the second consecutive week. Chandler caught 7 passes for 116 yards. Fouts completed 29 of 52 passes for 334 yards, one touchdown and one interception. The touchdown pass was the 254th and final one of his career.

Week 15: vs. Indianapolis Colts 

A fifth straight loss nearly eliminated the Chargers from playoff contention. They began the game well, taking the opening kickoff and driving 74 yards in 13 plays to take the lead. Fouts completed 5 of 5 passes for 56 yards, and scored on a 4th-down quarterback sneak. Indianapolis tied the score later in the 1st quarter when Bill Brooks took advantage of a coverage error by Bayless on a 42-yard touchdown catch. The Chargers reached the Colts' 25 yard line in the 2nd quarter, but Fouts took a 3rd-down sack and Abbott was short and left on a 52-yard field goal try. Indianapolis scored through a pair of Biasucci field goals on their final two possessions of the half, and led 13–7.

Neither team advanced further than the opposition 34 during the first twelve possessions of the second half; Indianapolis punted six times, while San Diego punted four times and Fouts was intercepted twice. Eventually, Dickerson broke off a 53-yard run and Bentley scored on the play after the two minute warning. Fouts threw incomplete on 4th and 2 from the Colt 26 in the final minute, and was intercepted as time expired.

Fouts completed 22 of 37 attempts for 257 yards and 3 interceptions, while being sacked 5 times for the loss of 43 yards. It was the final game of his career, as he missed the finale with a slightly torn rotator cuff, and announced his retirement three months after the end of the season. The result meant that San Diego would be eliminated if either the Steelers or Oilers won in Week 16, regardless of their own result.

Week 16: at Denver Broncos 

San Diego's seasons ended with a shutout in a Denver blizzard. They were confirmed to have missed the playoffs during the 1st quarter, when Houston completed a victory over the Cincinnati Bengals. By then, the Chargers already trailed to a 71-yard punt return touchdown. Denver added a second touchdown later in the quarter, with San Diego yet to register a first down after three possessions. The Chargers were inside the Denver 30 three times in the 2nd quarter, but Herrmann was intercepted twice, and Abbott missed a 26-yard field goal. The Chargers gained only 22 yards and a single first down after halftime, while Denver added a field goal and an interception-return touchdown.

Herrmann finished with 13 completions from 23 attempts for 123 yards, with 4 interceptions; backup Vlasic added a fifth interception on his debut appearance. Winslow caught 6 passes for 44 yards. It was the final regular season game of his career, as he retired during the 1988 season without playing again.

Standings

Awards 
Three Chargers were named to the 1988 Pro Bowl, each of whom was also named a 2nd-team All-Pro by the Associated Press.

References

San Diego Chargers
San Diego Chargers seasons
San Diego Chargers f